The Jaguariaíva River Canyon (Portuguese: Cânion do Rio Jaguariaíva) is a canyon in Jaguariaíva, Paraná, Brazil. The Jaguariaíva River flows through the canyon. The canyon is the 8th longest canyon in the world.
Part of the canyon is protected by the  Cerrado State Park, created in 1992.

References

Canyons of Paraná
Landforms of Paraná (state)
Jaguariaíva